Phycolepidozia exigua is the only species of liverwort in the genus Phycolepidozia and family Phycolepidoziaceae. It is endemic to Dominica, where it is critically endangered.  Its natural habitat is subtropical or tropical moist lowland forests.

The species is unique among the leafy liverworts in the extreme reduction of its lateral leaves.  These leaves consist of only two cells at maturity, so that plants are essentially leafless.

References

External links

Jungermanniales
Monotypic bryophyte genera
Critically endangered plants
Endemic flora of Dominica
Taxonomy articles created by Polbot
Jungermanniales genera